The Canadian Association of Snowboard Instructors (CASI) is Canada's national professional snowboard teaching organisation.  

CASI is the oldest snowboard teaching organisation in North America,  founded in 1994, three years before the  founding of AASI. Headquartered in  Cambridge, Ontario, CASI is organised into six regions in Canada.

CASI runs teaching courses and certifies instructors in Canada, Japan, South Korea, and Andorra.

Organisation 
CASI is organised into six regions: British Columbia, Alberta, Manitoba/Saskatchewan, Ontario, Quebec, and Atlantic.  CASI has a Technical and Evaluation Committee that considers course content and technical principles.

Membership 
To become a member of CASI, it is necessary to pass an instructor certification course.  CASI offers four levels of instructor certification and an additional freestyle certification.  Instructors are evaluated on technical skills and teaching skills.

The CASI level 1 course is recognized as credit for graduation in the Canadian province of British Columbia.

References

External links
Canadian Association of Snowboard Instructors

Professional associations based in Canada
Sports professional associations
Snowboarding